The 1972 Virginia Cavaliers football team represented the University of Virginia during the 1972 NCAA University Division football season. The Cavaliers were led by second-year head coach Don Lawrence and played their home games at Scott Stadium in Charlottesville, Virginia. They competed as members of the Atlantic Coast Conference, finishing tied for last.

Schedule

References

Virginia
Virginia Cavaliers football seasons
Virginia Cavaliers football